State Road 88 (NM 88) is a  state highway in the US state of New Mexico. NM 88's western terminus is at U.S. Route 70 (US 70) in Portales, and the eastern terminus is at Farm to Market Road 746 (FM 746) at the Texas / New Mexico border.

Major intersections

See also

References

088
Transportation in Roosevelt County, New Mexico